Brian Ferreira (born 24 May 1994) is an Argentine-Iraqi professional footballer who plays as midfielder for Singapore Premier League club Hougang United.

Club career
Brian Ferreira was a product of Velez Sarsfield academy, which produces great players like Carlos Bianchi and Nicolás Otamendi. He was considered as one of the most exciting prospects at Velez, having been promoted to the club's senior team in January 2016.

However, due to his club's worsening financial situation, Ferreira was released as a free agent in September 2016. He then went to Olimpo but failed to impress. He was then quickly loaned to Independiente's reserve team, where he failed to make a single appearance

Having failed to stamp his mark on Argentina, Ferreira moved his footballing career to Asia. His first destination is Johor Darul Ta'zim whom are seeking a direct replacement for outgoing Jorge Pereyra Díaz.

Although Ferreira was born and grew up in Argentina, he currently holds an Iraqi passport and in the 2017 Malaysia Super League season, he was registered as an AFC player as part of the 4 foreign players allowed to be registered per team. As a result, he is eligible to represent Iraq on an international level.

PSS Sleman
On 1 March 2019, Ferreira signed a one-year contract with Indonesian Liga 1 club PSS Sleman. On 15 May, he made his debut by starting in a 3–1 win against Arema. And he also scored his first goal for the team, he scored in the 2nd minute at the Maguwoharjo Stadium. Ferreira ended his first season at PSS Sleman with 20 appearances and  9 goals in 2019 Liga 1.

Persela Lamongan
Ferreira was signed for Persela Lamongan to play in Liga 1 in the 2020 season. Ferreira decided to leave Persela after the announcement of the release of the 2021-22 Liga 1 certainty, the decision was revealed through an upload via his personal Instagram account, he was recruited by the team after the 2020 Liga 1 was suspended in the third week due to the COVID-19 pandemic.

PSIS Semarang
On 7 August 2021, Ferreira signed a one-year contract with Indonesian Liga 1 club PSIS Semarang. On 29 September, he made his league debut by starting in a 0–0 draw against Madura United at the Wibawa Mukti Stadium.

Hougang United 
On 28 January 2023, Hougang United announced the signing of Ferreira for the upcoming Singapore Premier League season.

International career
On international level, Ferreira represented Argentina in the 2011 FIFA U-17 World Cup that was held in Mexico, in which he managed to score an amazing halfway-line goal in a 3–1 defeat against Japan.

Honours

Club
Vélez Sarsfield
 Argentine Primera División (2): 2012 Inicial, 2012–13 Superfinal
 Supercopa Argentina: 2013
Coquimbo Unido
 Primera B de Chile: 2018

International 
Argentina U-17
 South American Under-17 Championship third place: 2011

References

External links
 Argentine Primera statistics at Fútbol XXI 

1994 births
Living people
Argentine footballers
Argentine expatriate footballers
Argentine people of Iraqi descent
Association football midfielders
Argentina youth international footballers
Club Atlético Vélez Sarsfield footballers
Club Atlético Independiente footballers
Olimpo footballers
Johor Darul Ta'zim F.C. players
Fuerza Amarilla S.C. footballers
Coquimbo Unido footballers
PSS Sleman players
Persela Lamongan players
PSIS Semarang players
Persiraja Banda Aceh players
Cafetaleros de Chiapas footballers
Argentine Primera División players
Malaysia Super League players
Primera B de Chile players
Liga 1 (Indonesia) players
Ascenso MX players
Expatriate footballers in Chile
Expatriate footballers in Ecuador
Expatriate footballers in Malaysia
Expatriate footballers in Indonesia
Expatriate footballers in Mexico
Argentine expatriate sportspeople in Chile
Argentine expatriate sportspeople in Ecuador
Argentine expatriate sportspeople in Malaysia
Iraqi expatriate sportspeople in Malaysia
Argentine expatriate sportspeople in Indonesia
Argentine expatriate sportspeople in Mexico
Footballers from Buenos Aires